Mahdabad may refer to:
Mahdabad, Hormozgan
Mahdabad, Kerman